Även en blomma is a song written by Anders Glenmark. The song was recorded by Anni-Frid Lyngstad for her solo album, Djupa andetag. This single was released on 21 August the same year as Frida had released her fifth album.

The song also charted at Svensktoppen for four weeks between 28 September and 19 October 1996.

Chart positions

Weekly charts

Year-end charts

References

1996 singles
Anni-Frid Lyngstad songs
Songs written by Anders Glenmark
1996 songs